Lemuel Purnell Montgomery (c. 1786 – March 27, 1814) was an American military officer who fought in the Creek War. Montgomery was an attorney in Nashville, Tennessee, when the War of 1812 broke out, and was commissioned as a major of the 39th Infantry. He was killed in the Battle of Horseshoe Bend, at the conclusion of the Creek War, on March 27, 1814.

In all likelihood, Lemuel Montgomery was the namesake of Fort Montgomery, which was established the same year that he died, two miles from Fort Mims. In 1816, Montgomery County, Alabama, was named in his honor. About twenty years later, the town and county of Montgomery in Texas were established and named after Montgomery County, Alabama.

References

External links

1814 deaths
People from Nashville, Tennessee
United States Army officers
People of the Creek War
American military personnel killed in the War of 1812
Montgomery County, Alabama
Year of birth uncertain